The General Liu rifle is named after its inventor and the first Superintendent of Hanyang Arsenal - General Liu Qing En (1869-1929), as the rifle never received any other designation. It was probably the first Chinese semi-automatic rifle. The rifle used a muzzle "gas-trap"  system similar to Bang rifle  (other rifles including this system were: Gewehr 41 and early production models of M1 Garand). The rifle's method of operation could be switched
from gas to straight-pull bolt action by rotating counterclockwise the cylinder located on the muzzle, to revert to gas-operated reloading the cylinder had to be rotated back (clockwise).
The stock had a compartment for cleaning tools.

History
 
At the beginning of 1914 General Liu contacted Pratt & Whitney Tool Company, Hartford in order to purchase machinery for Hanyang Arsenal. A contract for US$1,082,500 was signed with the company on April 11, with an expected delivery in 24 months. Later that year, on September, Liu along with his family and seven subordinates arrived at Hartford, the purpose of the visit was to familiarize with the machinery. Liu stayed at Hartford at least until June 1915. On September 8, 1916 two versions of the rifle were tested at Nan Yuan Proving Ground in Beijing. The first version was made at Hanyang with a hand-made driving spring, the second was manufactured at Pratt & Whitney and had a machined spring. The test revealed that the hand-made springs proved to be too weak to properly cycle the rounds, as opposed to the ones produced in USA. In 1918 two rifles were tested at Springfield Armory by Julian Hatcher. In the summer of 1919 during an Army Department meeting Liu suffered a stroke which caused paralysis of one side of his body, supposedly due to the fact that the vessel with the machinery onboard sank on its way to China. Later that year the machinery was recovered and arrived at Shanghai. It was kept in a warehouse until 1921, when it was diverted to Gongxian Arsenal. After being sent to Gongxian, in an ironic twist, the machinery and tooling equipment was later redirected back to Hanyang but this did not happen until 1935. When the machinery arrived at Hanyang, it was set up and initially used to manufacture Hanyang 88 rifles but was later changed to produce Type 24 Chiang Kai-shek rifles.

References

External links
Springfield Armory Museum Record
General Liu rifle
Rare Chinese Liu semi-auto military rifle. A National Firearms Museum Treasure Gun. 
Bin Shih and the General Liu Rifle
photograph of General Liu
Hanyang report on the General Liu Rifle
Hanyang report on the General Liu Rifle (in Chinese)
The first Chinese semi-automatic rifle by General Liu Qing En 國造半自動步槍第一人- 劉慶恩將軍
From the October 2003 issue, pages 261 - 264
Semiauto Rifles of WWI and Before
 Rare Chinese Liu Semi-Automatic Military Rifle

Firearms of the Republic of China
7.92×57mm Mauser semi-automatic rifles
Straight-pull rifles
World War II infantry weapons of China